The 2012 Arab Junior Athletics Championships was the fifteenth edition of the international athletics competition for under-20 athletes from Arab countries. It took place between 16–19 May at Amman International Stadium in Amman, Jordan. It was the first time that Jordan hosted the event. A total of 42 athletics events were contested, 21 for men and 21 for women. The men's 10,000 metres and women's 5000 metres were dropped from the programme for this edition.

Egypt topped the medal table with nine gold medals, narrowly edging Tunisia which had eight golds and the same total of 23 overall. Saudi Arabia won eight gold medals and Algeria had the third highest tally at sixteen medals (six gold). The host nation Jordan did not win any events but managed three silvers and a bronze. A total of fifteen nations reached the medal table.

Medal summary

Men

Women

Medal table

References

Results
15th Pan Arab Junior Championships in Athletics. Tunis Athle (archived). Retrieved on 2016-07-04.

Arab Junior Athletics Championships
International athletics competitions hosted by Jordan
Sports competitions in Amman
Arab Junior Athletics Championships
Arab Junior Athletics Championships
2012 in youth sport